The 2001 Wagner Seahawks football team represented Wagner College in the 2001 NCAA Division I-AA football season as a member of the Northeast Conference (NEC). The Seahawks were led by 21st-year head coach Walt Hameline and played their home games at Wagner College Stadium. Wagner finished the season 3–6 overall and 3–5 in NEC play to tie for fourth place. Wagner's September 15 game at Georgetown was canceled due to college football's collective decision to postpone games following the September 11 attacks.

Schedule

References

Wagner
Wagner Seahawks football seasons
Wagner Seahawks football